Nepali Janata Dal is a political party in Nepal. The party was established in 1995 as the United People's Party. The party identifies itself as progressive, nationalist and socialist.

Hari Charan Shah is the party chairman, Kabiraj Timilsina the vice-Chairman, Dipak Raj Pandey the General secretary. In total, the Central Committee of the party has 41 members.

In the 2008 Constituent Assembly election, the NJD won two seats through the proportional representation vote. It got 48990 PR votes (0.46%). The party selected Vishwanath Prasad Agrawal and Gayatri Shah as its representatives in the assembly.  Gayatri Shah was the nominated parliamentary leader of the party.

Electoral performance

Nepalese Legislative Elections

References

1995 establishments in Nepal
Nationalist parties in Asia
Nepalese nationalism
Political parties established in 1995
Progressive parties
Socialist parties in Nepal